The Fourth Mother of all Battles Championship, commonly referred to as the 1994 Iraqi Elite Cup, was the fourth occurrence of the Iraqi Elite Cup, organised by the Iraq Football Association. The top eight teams of the 1993–94 Iraqi National League competed in the tournament. The competition started on 15 September 1994 and ended on 26 September 1994 where, in the final, held at Al-Shaab Stadium, Al-Quwa Al-Jawiya defeated Al-Talaba 4–3 on penalties after a 0–0 draw.

Group stage

Group 1

Group 2

Semifinals

Third place match

Final

References

External links
 Iraqi Football Website

Football competitions in Iraq
1994–95 in Iraqi football